The China–United States Exchange Foundation (CUSEF) is a Hong Kong-based nonprofit organization whose stated aim is to encourage dialogue and exchanges between the people of the United States and China. CUSEF was founded in 2008 by Tung Chee-hwa, a billionaire, former Chief Executive of Hong Kong, and vice chair of the Chinese People's Political Consultative Conference, who remains the chairman of the foundation. CUSEF's governing board has included members such as Ronnie Chan, Elsie Leung, and Victor Fung. 

CUSEF donates to universities and think tanks in the U.S. while also sponsoring trips for journalists, students, and former U.S. officials and politicians to China to speak with officials. According to various journalists and academics, CUSEF is a central part of the Chinese Communist Party's united front strategy of influence in the U.S.

History 
According to Foreign Agents Registration Act (FARA) filings, CUSEF is classified as a "foreign principal" which has hired lobbying and public relations firms since 2009 such as Brown Lloyd James, Fontheim International, Covington & Burling, Capitol Counsel LLC, Podesta Group, and Wilson Global Communications to craft and promote pro-Beijing messages.

Sanya Initiative 
Since 2008, CUSEF has partnered with the China Association for International Friendly Contact and the EastWest Institute to organize forums, termed the U.S.-China Sanya Initiative, between retired People's Liberation Army (PLA) officers and retired U.S. military personnel. Past forums were reported to have attempted to influence retired U.S. military officers to lobby against U.S. arms sales to Taiwan and to delay a Pentagon report on PLA capabilities.

University funding 
CUSEF funds the Pacific Community Initiative at the Paul H. Nitze School of Advanced International Studies at Johns Hopkins University.

In 2018, the University of Texas at Austin refused a donation from CUSEF after a letter by Senator Ted Cruz raised concerns about the foundation's reported links to the Chinese Communist Party.

Foundation grants 
In 2021, CUSEF gave a $5 million grant to the George H.W. Bush Foundation for U.S.-China Relations. CUSEF also provides funding to the Carter Center and has partnered with the Carnegie Endowment for International Peace, Brookings Institution, Atlantic Council, and Center for American Progress.

References

External links 

 

Think tanks based in Hong Kong
Foundations based in Hong Kong
2008 establishments in Hong Kong
United front (China)